Warren Central High School, also known as Warren, WC, or WCHS, is a public high school located in Warren Township on the far east side of Indianapolis, Indiana. It is the only high school in Warren Township with an enrollment of 3,736 students, in grades 9-12, as of the 2016-2017 school year. Warren Central is known as "The Pride of the Eastside". Its school colors are Black and Vegas Gold and the nickname is the Warriors. The school fight song is Rah, Rah For Warren. The original Warren Central opened on January 12, 1925, at the corner of 10th Street and Post Road on the far east side of Indianapolis.  It was a consolidation of the Cumberland and Shadeland schools which both had high schools that were too small for the growing township population. Warren Central was built to house grades 7 to 12 and to give the students a city quality education in a farm community. By the late 1950s, the population of Warren Township had once again outgrown its high school and, on September 6, 1960, a new Warren Central opened at its present location off of 9500 East 16th Street.  In 1976, the Walker Career Center opened on the property of the high school.

Athletics
The school is best known for athletic success, competing as a member of the nationally recognized Metropolitan Interscholastic Conference. Warren Central has a total of 28 State Championship titles since winning its first title in 1980. State championships include Girls Basketball (1), Boys Basketball  (1), Boys Cross Country (2), Boys Track (4), Girls Track (5), Boys Golf (1), Boys Gymnastics (2), Softball (1), Wrestling (2), and Football (9).

Warren Central was ranked the third-best athletic program in the US and first among public schools by Sports Illustrated in 2007.

Notable alumni
Jamie Asher - Former NFL tight end for the Washington Redskins and Philadelphia Eagles
David Bell - Current Wide Receiver for the Cleveland Browns.
Shakir Bell - Former CFL running back for the Edmonton Eskimos
Justin Beriault - Former NFL safety for the Dallas Cowboys
Sheldon Day - Current Defensive Tackle for the Cleveland Browns
Darren Evans - Former NFL running back for the Indianapolis Colts and Tennessee Titans
Jeff George - Former NFL quarterback for the Indianapolis Colts (1990–1993), Atlanta Falcons (1994–1996), Oakland Raiders (1997–1998), Minnesota Vikings (1999), Washington Redskins (2000–2001), Seattle Seahawks (2002) and Chicago Bears (2004)
Greg Graham - Former NBA shooting guard for the Philadelphia 76ers, New Jersey Nets, Seattle SuperSonics and Cleveland Cavaliers. Graham also played for the Continental Basketball League and the Swedish Basketball League
Jewel Hampton - Former running back for the CFL's Montreal Alouettes and the NFL's San Francisco 49ers
Aubrey Herring - Track and field athlete, Indiana State
Robert M. Jacobson - Current medical director of the Population Health Science Program of the Robert D. and Patricia E. Kern Center for the Science of Health Care Delivery. Former chair of Pediatric and Adolescent Medicine at the Mayo Clinic
Andrew McDonald - Former NFL offensive tackle for the Seattle Seahawks
Candyce McGrone, USA Track & Field athlete who holds personal records of 11.00 second for the 100-meter dash and 22.08 seconds for the 200-meter dash
Ryan Murphy - Film and television screenwriter, director and producer; creator of the TV series Glee, American Horror Story and Nip/Tuck
Jane Pauley - Television journalist and host. Best known for her time as co-host of the Today show and Dateline NBC
Adrien Robinson - Former NFL tight end for the New York Jets and the New York Giants
Justin Smith - Former NFL linebacker for the Tampa Bay Buccaneers, St. Louis Rams, Arizona Cardinals and Carolina Panthers
Jason Whitlock - Sportswriter and personality for Fox Sports 1
Robert McMurrer - Actor, Author and Filmmaker was class of 2000 before moving out west.

See also
 List of high schools in Indiana
 Metropolitan Interscholastic Conference
 Indianapolis, Indiana

References

External links
 Official Website for Warren Central
 Official Website for The OWL

Schools in Indianapolis
W
Educational institutions established in 1924
1924 establishments in Indiana